Shady Grove was a restaurant in Austin, Texas, in the United States. The restaurant closed in 2020, during the COVID-19 pandemic, after operating for 28 years.

History
Mike Young and John Zapp opened Shady Grove in 1992.

See also

 Impact of the COVID-19 pandemic on the restaurant industry in the United States

References

External links
 
 Shady Grove Restaurant at Lonely Planet
 Shady Grove at Zagat
 Shady Grove at Zomato

1992 establishments in Texas
2020 disestablishments in Texas
COVID-19 pandemic in Texas
Defunct restaurants in Texas
Restaurants disestablished during the COVID-19 pandemic
Restaurants disestablished in 2020
Restaurants established in 1992